Beatrice Mary Beckley was an English-born actress of stage and screen.

Beckley was born in Roedean, East Sussex, England, in 1885. She made her stage debut in a 1901 London production of H. V. Esmond's The Wilderness before moving to the United States. She spent four seasons with the company of James K. Hackett, before marrying him in December 1911.

Beckley appeared in many theater productions in the United States, including main roles in The Walls of Jericho, Samson, and The Prisoner of Zenda, opposite Hackett. She also reprised her stage roles in film adaptations of  The Prisoner of Zenda (1913) and Should a Husband Forgive? (1919).

After the death of her husband in 1926, Beckley inherited a life interest in most of Hackett's property and over $273,000 USD.

References

Further reading
 Special Correspondent (March 22, 1921). "Beatrice Beckley: An Interview with Mrs. James K. Hackett". The Christian Science Monitor. p. 12.

External links

 
 
 

1885 births
20th-century English actresses
Year of death missing
English stage actresses
British emigrants to the United States